The Aceh Party is a regional political party in Indonesia. It contested the 2009 elections in the province of Aceh, and is the largest party in the Aceh provincial legislature.

History
The Aceh Party was formerly known as GAM Party (Partai GAM) after the Free Aceh Movement (GAM), a separatist group that waged a war for Aceh independence from 1976 to 2005. Many of the party's leaders were senior figures in GAM, including its chairman Muzakir Manaf, who was a former commander of GAM's military wing.

2009 elections
The party stood in the 2009 elections in Aceh, and was predicted to win in at least 15 of Aceh's 21 regencies. The party set a target of 70% of the Aceh vote. During the election campaign, party buildings and vehicles were attacked, including the use of grenades and bombs. Shots were fired at party members. On several occasions, Indonesian Armed Forces personnel lowered Aceh Party flags.

The party won 46.91% of the votes in the province, by far the largest share, beating both local and national parties. This was enough to give it 33 of the 69 seats in the provincial legislature.

2012 election 
Zaini Abdullah of the Aceh Party was elected with 55.9% of the vote in the Acehnese gubernatorial election of 2012.

2014 elections
The party contested the 2014 legislative elections, again only in Aceh. Despite optimistically claiming it would win 60 to 70% of the Acehnese vote during the election campaign, its vote fell sharply to 35.3 percent, although this was enough for a plurality. One reason for the drop in its vote was the internal party conflict that had raged since February 2011, which led to several Aceh Party members to leave to establish the Aceh National Party. The Aceh Party won 29 of the 81 seats in the provincial legislature.

References

Nationalist parties in Indonesia
Political parties in Indonesia